Sacatra was a term used in the French Colony of Saint-Domingue to describe the descendant of one black and one griffe parent, a person whose ancestry is ths black and th white. It was one of the many terms used in the colony's racial caste system to measure one's black blood.

The etymology of sacatra is uncertain; Félix Rodríguez González linked it to the Spanish sacar ("take out") and atrás ("behind"); thus, a sacatra is a slave who is not kept in the house or at the front as a lighter-skinned servant might be.

In fiction 
 In French author Suzanne Dracius' 1989 novel, The Dancing Other, she mentions her main character finding "true friendship with a cheery sacatra girl with soft, caramel skin."
Nalo Hopkinson's speculative fiction novel The Salt Roads begins with Georgine, a slave girl who gets pregnant by a white man, denying that her child is going to be "just mulatto. I’m griffonne, my mother was sacatra. The baby will be marabou.”

See also
 Mulatto Haitians
 Quadroon
 Octoroon
 Affranchi
 Gens de couleur
 Afro-Haitians
 Marabou

References

Multiracial affairs in the Caribbean
Saint-Domingue
Mulatto
Ethnic groups in Haiti
Person of color